Klim Hennadiyovych Prykhodko (born 9 February 2000) is a Ukrainian professional footballer who plays as a midfielder for Kryvbas Kryvyi Rih.

Career
Born in Kryvyi Rih, Prykhodko is a product of Dnipro Dnipropetrovsk and Dynamo Kyiv youth sportive school systems.
He played on loan for Vorskla Poltava and Mariupol in the Ukrainian Premier League Reserves and in August 2021 signed one year loan contract with Kryvbas Kryvyi Rih from the Ukrainian First League.

On 7 January 2023 he moved to Kryvbas Kryvyi Rih signing a three-year contract.

Personal life
Prykhodko is the son of the Ukrainian football manager Hennadiy Prykhodko.

References

External links
 
 

2000 births
Living people
Sportspeople from Kryvyi Rih
Ukrainian footballers
FC Vorskla Poltava players
FC Mariupol players
FC Kryvbas Kryvyi Rih players
Ukrainian First League players
Association football midfielders
Ukraine youth international footballers